Starcza  is a village in Częstochowa County, Silesian Voivodeship, in southern Poland. It is the seat of the gmina (administrative district) called Gmina Starcza.

Starcza has a population of 1,232.

References

Villages in Częstochowa County